The Bais is a Rajput clan from India.

History 
Their wealth caused Donald Butter, a visiting doctor who wrote Outlines of the Topography and Statistics of the Southern Districts of Oudh, and of the Cantonment of Sultanpur-Oudh, to describe the Bais Rajput in the 1830s as the "best dressed and housed people of the southern Oudh".

The Bais Rajputs were known for well-building.

Famous Personalities 

Rana Beni Madho: Freedom fighter, leader of First war of independence or 1857 rebellion in Oudh.
Major Dhyan Chand: Great hockey player and Olympian, India's highest sports award Major Dhyan Chand Khel Ratna is named after him.

Tilok chand: The eponymous ancestor of the Bais of Baiswara.

See also 
 Baiswara
 Rajput clans

References 

Rajput clans of Uttar Pradesh